Dayle Edward Coleing (born 23 October 1996) is a Gibraltarian professional footballer, who plays as a goalkeeper for Lincoln Red Imps and the Gibraltar national football team.

Club career

Early career and breakthrough at Europa
As a child, Coleing played youth football in Wiltshire for Warminster Highbury while his father was stationed in the UK, and during this time he trained with Bristol Rovers Academy.  Upon his return to Gibraltar, he joined Manchester 62 where he made his senior debut at 16, before progressing to the dominant Lincoln Red Imps side. However, after just one season, he would return to Manchester 62 ahead of a move to the UK, where he would study at Leeds Trinity University. There, he would play for the university side as well as non-league clubs Thackley and Liversedge. During this time he was also offered a trial at Sheffield United and trained with Guiseley.

After completing his studies, Coleing returned to Gibraltar in 2017 to join Gibraltar Phoenix, however it would be at Europa where he would finally secure his position as first choice keeper during the 2019–20 season. His performances at club and international level subsequently attracted the attention of a number of overseas clubs, including Northern Irish side Glentoran. However, Europa FC expressed a reluctance to let Coleing leave for Northern Ireland without triggering his £50,000 release clause, citing the UEFA coefficients when stating their belief that Glentoran would be a "sideways step" for the keeper.

Glentoran

Nonetheless, in August 2020 Glentoran offered the full £50,000 release fee for Coleing, and on 10 August Europa announced that Coleing had left the club. He was officially announced by the Glens the next day, becoming the first Gibraltarian to play for the Northern Irish side since Colin Ramirez in the 1993–94 season. He kept a clean sheet on his debut in a 1–0 Europa League win over Havnar Bóltfelag. Despite securing his status as first choice goalkeeper in his first season with some impressive displays for club and country, he was loaned back to Lincoln Red Imps on 12 August 2021.

International career
Despite being involved with the senior team since 2014 (and appearing with the team in Non-FIFA football since the age of 15), Coleing made his international debut for Gibraltar on 5 September 2019, starting in the UEFA Euro 2020 qualifying match against Denmark. While studying in England, he also represented the England Universities North squad. Throughout the 2020–21 UEFA Nations League campaign, Coleing shared goalkeeping duties with Kyle Goldwin as Gibraltar earned an historic promotion in a group with Liechtenstein and San Marino. In March 2021, after making a string of impressive saves despite a 3–0 loss to Norway in a 2022 FIFA World Cup qualification game, Coleing earned a number of plaudits from commentators including former Norway striker Jan Åge Fjørtoft, who compared his performance to Manuel Neuer and Jan Oblak.

Career statistics

International

References

External links
 

1996 births
Living people
Gibraltarian footballers
Association football goalkeepers
Europa F.C. players
Gibraltar Phoenix F.C. players
Glentoran F.C. players
Lincoln Red Imps F.C. players
Liversedge F.C. players
Manchester 62 F.C. players
Thackley A.F.C. players
Gibraltar international footballers
Gibraltar Premier Division players
Alumni of Leeds Trinity University
Gibraltar National League players